Troendleina is a chemosymbiotic bivalve genus in  the subfamily Lucininae of the family Lucinidae.

Species
 Troendleina marquesana Cosel & Bouchet, 2008
 Troendleina musculator Cosel & Bouchet, 2008
 Troendleina suluensis Glover & J. D. Taylor, 2016

References

 Cosel R. von & Bouchet P. (2008). Tropical deep-water lucinids (Mollusca: Bivalvia) from the Indo-Pacific: essentially unknown, but diverse and occasionally gigantic. in: Héros V. et al. (eds), Tropical Deep-Sea Benthos volume 25. Mémoires du Muséum national d'Histoire naturelle. 196: 115-213.
 Taylor J. & Glover E. (2021). Biology, evolution and generic review of the chemosymbiotic bivalve family Lucinidae. London: The Ray Society [Publication 182]. 319 pp.

Lucinidae
Bivalve genera